The New Canal Light or (more commonly New Canal Lighthouse or New Basin Canal Lighthouse) was first established in 1838 at the north end of the New Basin Canal which ran from Lake Pontchartrain to the Uptown or "American" section of the city which today is known as the New Orleans Central Business District. The canal was filled in about 1950, but the lighthouse remained on a jetty extending into the lake on a half mile long stretch of the canal that was left and is still used as a small boat and yachting harbor.

History
The original lighthouse was built in 1838 on a foundation of sheet piling filled in with shells. The tower deteriorated badly and was replaced in 1855 with a square wood dwelling on screw piles with an iron lantern and a 5th order Fresnel lens. The 1890 structure was substantially rebuilt in 1901. It was damaged by hurricanes in 1903, 1915, 1926, and 1927. It was moved to its current location in 1910. After the 1927 damage it was raised on new concrete piers and in 1936, the breakwater surrounding it was filled in, putting land under the structure for the first time. From the 1960s through 2001 there was a USCG station at the site.

The lighthouse was heavily damaged during the 2005 hurricane season by Hurricanes Katrina and Rita. The first floor had collapsed and its cupola had fallen off. In 2006, the Lake Pontchartrain Basin Foundation signed a lease with the United States Coast Guard to repair the damaged lighthouse. It was disassembled and the building was put into storage. Reconstruction of the lighthouse began in February 2012 and was completed in 2013 by Certified Construction Professional of New Orleans, LA..

The lighthouse was added to the National Register of Historic Places in 1985 as the New Canal Lighthouse.

It is now operated as the New Canal Lighthouse Museum and Education Center by the Lake Pontchartrain Basin Foundation. The museum's exhibits include the history of the lighthouse, the environment and ecology of the Pontchartrain Basin, a Fresnel lens that was believed to have been in the lighthouse in the early 1900s, the work of the Foundation, and area history and recreation.

Gallery

See also
List of lighthouses in the United States
New Basin Canal
West End, New Orleans

References

External links

 New Canal Lighthouse Museum and Education Center  - Lake Pontchartrain Basin Foundation

Lighthouses completed in 1838
Lighthouses completed in 1855
Lighthouses completed in 1890
Transportation buildings and structures in New Orleans
Lighthouses on the National Register of Historic Places in Louisiana
Effects of Hurricane Katrina
Tourist attractions in New Orleans
Museums in New Orleans
Maritime museums in Louisiana
National Register of Historic Places in New Orleans
1838 establishments in Louisiana
Former National Register of Historic Places in Louisiana